The Customs-Trade Partnership Against Terrorism (C-TPAT) is a voluntary supply-chain security program led by U.S. Customs and Border Protection (CBP) focused on improving the security of private companies' supply chains with respect to terrorism.  The program was launched in November 2001 with seven initial participants, all large U.S. companies.  As of December 1, 2014, the program had 10,854 members. The 4,315 importers in the program account for approximately 54% of the value of all merchandise imported into the U.S.

Companies who achieve C-TPAT certification must have a documented process for determining and alleviating risk throughout their international supply chain. This allows companies to be considered low risk, resulting in expedited processing of their cargo, including fewer customs examinations.

Companies eligible to become CTPAT Certified
 US importers of record
 US Exporters
 US/Canada and US/Mexico cross-border highway carriers
 Mexico long-haul highway carriers
 Rail carriers
 Sea carriers
 Air carriers
 US marine port authority and terminal operators
 Consolidators (US air freight consolidators, ocean transportation intermediaries and non-vessel operating common carriers)
 Mexican manufacturers
 Canadian manufacturers
 Certain invited foreign manufacturers
 Licensed US customs brokers
 Third-party logistics providers
 Customs House Agent(CHA)providers

C-TPAT partner benefits

According to U.S. Customs and Border Protection, the benefits of participating in C-TPAT could include:
 Playing an active role in the war against terrorism and good corporate citizenship
 A reduced number of CBP inspections
 Priority processing (front-of-line) for CBP inspections
 Eligibility to attend C-TPAT training seminars
 Prerequisite for participation in the importer self-assessment program
 Penalty mitigation under certain circumstances
 Assigned security consultant, a supply-chain security specialist
 Tier III importers allowed block designation application to DHS SAFETY Act
 Exporters who allow CBP to share information with other customs agencies gain reduced inspections upon arrival in those countries (see below list)

Using the right technology, the processes of supplier data collection, organization, and risk analysis can be done easily, without requiring large investments into IT infrastructure or resources. The primary goal of the C-TPAT program is not to add more work for the importer or the companies participating, but to help improve the security of all global supply chains.

U.S. Senators Susan Collins and Patty Murray have introduced a bill in Congress, the GreenLane Maritime Cargo Security Act, which would enhance these potential benefits for companies at the highest level of security within C-TPAT.

CTPAT mutual recognition
Mutual recognition (MR) refers to those activities relates with the signing of a document between foreign customs administration that allows an exchange of information aiming to improve supply-chain security. The signed document, or MR, indicates that security requirements or standards of the foreign partnership program, as well as its validation procedures are similar. The essential concept of a mutual recognition agreement (MRA) is that CTPAT and the foreign program are compatible in both theory and practice so that one program will recognize the validation findings of the other program.

The following programs have mutual recognition with CTPAT:

New Zealand Customs Service – Secure Export Scheme Program (SES) – June 2007
Canada Border Services Agency – Partners in Protection Program (PIP) – June 2008
Jordan Customs Department – Golden List Program (GLP) – June 2007
Japan Customs and Tariff Bureau – Authorized Economic Operator Program (AEO) – June 2009
Korean Customs Service – AEO Program – June 2010
European Union – AEO Program – May 2012
Taiwan – General of Customs, Taiwan Ministry of Finance’s – AEO Program.* – November 2012
Israel – June 2014
Mexico – October 2014
Singapore – December 2014
Peru – 2018
 *Note: This MRA is signed between the American Institute in Taiwan (AIT) and the Taipei Economic and Cultural Representative Office (TECRO) in the United States. C-TPAT and Taiwan AEO are the designated parties responsible for implementing the MRA.

Through this initiative, CBP is asking businesses to ensure the integrity of their security practices and communicate and verify the security guidelines of their business partners within the supply chain.

Trusted Trader Program
When customs administrations offer tangible  to businesses that meet minimum security standards and follow best practices, those businesses are known as “trusted traders.”  This concept is internationally accepted and is entrenched in protocols such as the World Customs Organization SAFE Framework of Standards.

In North America, both CBP agency and the Canada Border Services Agency (CBSA) offer “trusted trader” programs, CBP’s Customs-Trade Partnership Against Terrorism (CTPAT) and the CBSA’s Partners In Protection (PIP) programs as well as the bi-national Free And Secure Trade (FAST) program.  Efforts are underway to Harmonize the application process and the administration of such partner accounts.

In the US, CBP and the trade have been collaborating for some time to create a design for a holistic, integrated Trusted Trader Program that includes both security and compliance requirements.  This approach will enable CBP to provide additional incentives to participating low risk partners, while benefiting from additional efficiencies of managing both supply chain security (CTPAT) and compliance (ISA) in one partnership program.

See also
 Supply-chain security
 U.S. Customs and Border Protection

References

External links
 

Supply chain management
Counterterrorism
Customs services